American Celtic punk band Dropkick Murphys has released twelve studio albums, three live albums, three compilation albums, sixteen extended plays, thirty-three singles and forty-three music videos.

Albums

Studio albums

Live albums

Compilation albums

Extended plays

Split releases/other (7″, 10″, 12″)

Singles

Notes

A  "I'm Shipping Up To Boston" did not enter the Alternative Songs chart, but peaked at number 13 on the Alternative Digital Songs chart.

B  "I'm Shipping Up To Boston" did not enter the Hot Rock Songs chart, but peaked at number 12 on the Rock Digital Songs chart.

C  "Going Out In Style" did not enter the Hot Rock Songs chart, but peaked at number 33 on the Rock Digital Songs chart.

D  "Rose Tattoo" did not enter the Alternative Songs chart, but peaked at number 14 on the Alternative Digital Songs chart.

E  "Paying My Way" did not enter the Alternative Songs chart, but peaked at number 25 on the Alternative Digital Songs chart.

F  "Mick Jones Nicked My Pudding" was released as an exclusive digital single through the band's website. The single features the b-side "James Connolly". Fans could pay what they wanted from $2 up to a $50 option, that featured a video shout-out from the band, or to a $100 option that would feature a "Roast Your Buddy" video by the band.

Other appearances
I've Got My Friends-Boston/San Francisco Split CD (1996) – Includes "Get Up" and "Skinhead On The MBTA" (original version).
Runt of the Litter, Vol. 2 (1996) – Includes "In The Streets of Boston (live June 29, 1996 @ TT the Bears)"
Oi! Skampilation Vol. 3 (1997) – Includes "Road of the Righteous" and "3rd Man In" (both live)
Give 'Em the Boot (1997) – Includes "Barroom Hero (original version)"
Vans Off the Wall Sampler (1998) – Includes "Road of the Righteous"
Give 'Em the Boot II (1999) – Includes "The Gang's All Here"
Vans Off the Wall Sampler (1999) – Includes "Boston Asphalt"
Punk Rock Jukebox Vol. 3 (1999) – Includes "Vengeance"
Built for Speed – A Motorhead Tribute (1999) – Includes "Rock and Roll"
Punch Drunk (1999) – Includes "You're a Rebel"
Boston Drops The Gloves: A Tribute to Slapshot (1999) – Includes "I've Had Enough"
The Sopranos (1999) - Uses "Cadence to Arms" in an episode
Punch Drunk Vol. 2 (2000) – Includes "Soundtrack to a Killing Spree"
A Worldwide Tribute to Oi (2000) – Includes "Hey Little Rich Boy" and "Never Again"
Back on the Streets – Japanese/American Punk Unity (2000) – Includes "Halloween" and "Soundtrack to a Killing Spree"
Dave Mirra Freestyle BMX (2000) – Uses "Never Alone" on video game soundtrack
Punk-O-Rama Vol. 5 (2000) – Includes "Good Rats (original version)"
Punk-O-Rama Vol. 6 (2001) – Includes "The Gauntlet"
A Tribute to Cock Sparrer (2001) – Includes "Working"
Give 'Em the Boot III (2002) – Includes "The Legend of Finn McCummhail"
Punk-O-Rama Vol. 7 (2002) – Includes "Heroes from Our Past"
Atticus: Dragging the Lake, Vol. 2 (2003) – Includes "Fields of Athenry"
Punk-O-Rama Vol. 8 (2003) – Includes "Gonna Be a Blackout Tonight"
2003 Warped Tour Compilation (2003) – Includes "Walk Away"
The O.C. (2003) - Uses "Walk Away" in an episode
Backyard Wrestling: Don't Try This at Home (2003) - Uses "This is Your Life" on video game soundtrack 
Late Night with Conan O'Brien (2003) - Band performance of "Walk Away"
Tony Hawk's Underground soundtrack (2003) – Includes "Time To Go"
Give 'Em the Boot IV (2004) – Includes "I'm Shipping Up to Boston (original version)"
Rock Against Bush, Vol. 2 (2004) – Includes "We Got the Power"
Punk-O-Rama Vol. 9 (2004) – Includes "The Dirty Glass" (Blackout version)
Punk-O-Rama Vol. 10 (2005) – Includes "The Warrior's Code"
MVP Baseball 2005 soundtrack (2005) – Includes "Tessie"
Fever Pitch soundtrack (2005) – Includes "Tessie"
Tony Hawk's American Wasteland soundtrack (2005) – Includes "Who is Who"
2005 Warped Tour Compilation (2005) – Includes "Sunshine Highway"
The Shield (2005) – Uses "Amazing Grace" in an episode
Jimmy Kimmel Live (2005) – Band performance of "The Dirty Glass"
Give 'Em the Boot V (2006) – Includes "Warriors Code"
Whiskey in the Jar: Essential Irish Drinking Songs and Sing Alongs (2006) – Includes "Fields of Athenry", "The Wild Rover", and "The Dirty Glass" (Blackout version)
The Departed soundtrack (2006) – Includes "I'm Shipping Up to Boston"
Late Night with David Letterman (2006) – Band performance of "I'm Shipping Up to Boston"
Give 'Em the Boot VI (2007) – Includes "Citizen C.I.A."
Lobster Wars (2007) – Uses "I'm Shipping Up to Boston" as its theme song
The Simpsons (2008) – Uses "I'm Shipping Up to Boston" in an episode
Sons of Anarchy (2008) – Uses "Johnny I Hardly Knew Ya" in an episode
Late Show with David Letterman (2008) – Band performance of "The State of Massachusetts"
Monkfish (2008) – Band appearance
Let Them Know: The Story of Youth Brigade and BYO Records (2009) – "Fight To Unite"
The Green Fields of France (short film) (2009) – Uses "The Green Fields of France" in the film
Nitro Circus (2009) – Uses "The State of Massachusetts" in two episodes
Late Late Show with Craig Ferguson (2009) – Band performance of "(F)lannigan's Ball"
Untitled 21: A Juvenile Tribute to the Swingin' Utters (2010) – "Strongman"
The Fighter (2010) – Uses "The Warrior's Code" in the film
NHL 11 soundtrack (2010) – Includes "I'm Shipping up to Boston (Live)"
Restrepo (2010) – Uses "Barroom Hero" in the movie's credits
2010 NHL Winter Classic (2010) – Band performance of "I'm Shipping Up to Boston"
Conan (2011) – Band performance of "Going Out in Style"
NHL 12 soundtrack (2011) – Includes "Hang 'Em High"
Big Evening Buzz (2012) – Band performance
Battleship (2012) – Uses "Hang 'Em High" in the film
Drink 'Em Dry (documentary) (2012) – Uses "Boys on the Docks" in the film
Respect Your Roots Worldwide (2012) – Includes "Badlands"
VH1's Big Morning Buzz (2012) – Band performance of "The Season's Upon Us"
Today (2013) – Band performance of "Rose Tattoo" (minus Barr and Wallace)
Boston's Finest (2013) – Uses "Out of Our Heads" as the theme song for the Boston-based police reality show
Late Night With David Letterman (2013) – Band performance of "Out of Our Heads"
Captain Morgan (2013) – "The Prisoner's Song" appears in commercial for the Rum
Conan (2013) – Band performance of "The Prisoner's Song"
NHL 14 (2013) – Includes "The Boys Are Back"
Patriots Day (2016) - Uses "Forever (2007 version)" during the film's closing credits
The Walking Dead (2017) - Uses "Prisoner's Song" in the season 8 Comic-Con trailer
NHL 22 (2021) - Includes "Good as Gold"

Video albums

Music videos

Tributes 
 Ex-USSR Tribute to Dropkick Murphys
 Famous For Nothing: A Tribute To Dropkick Murphys

References

External links
 Official website
 
 

Discographies of American artists
Punk rock group discographies